Alcides Sosa (born 24 March 1944) is a Paraguayan footballer. He played in 48 matches for the Paraguay national football team from 1968 to 1977. He was also part of Paraguay's squad for the 1975 Copa América tournament.

References

External links
 

1944 births
Living people
Paraguayan footballers
Paraguay international footballers
Association football defenders
People from Caraguatay, Paraguay